An  elixir is a sweet liquid used for medical purposes, to be taken orally and intended to cure one's illness. When used as a pharmaceutical preparation, an elixir contains at least one active ingredient designed to be taken orally.

Etymology

The word was introduced in late Middle English, through Latin from Arabic al-ʾiksīr (الإكسير), which in turn is the Arabization of Greek xērion (ξήριον) "powder for drying wounds" (from ξηρός xēros "dry"). For centuries elixir primarily meant an ingredient used in alchemy, either referring to a liquid which purportedly converts lead to gold, or a substance or liquid which is believed to cure all ills and give eternal life.

Types

Non-medicated elixirs 
These are used as solvents or vehicles for the preparation of medicated elixirs. Active ingredients are dissolved in a 15–⁠50% by volume solution of ethyl alcohol:
aromatic elixirs (USP)
isoalcoholic elixirs (NF)
compound benzaldehyde elixirs (NF)

Medicated elixirs 
These include:
 antihistaminic elixirs used against allergy, such as chlorpheniramine maleate (USP) or diphenhydramine HCl
 sedative and hypnotic elixirs, the former to induce drowsiness, the latter to induce sleep
pediatric elixirs such as chloral hydrate
expectorant elixirs used to facilitate productive cough (i.e. cough with sputum), such as terpin hydrate

East Asian vitamin drinks 
Daily non-alcoholic non-caffeinated 'vitamin drinks' have been popular in East Asia since the 1950s, with Oronamin from Otsuka Pharmaceutical perhaps the market leader. Packaged in brown light-proof bottles, these drinks have the reputation of being enjoyed by old men and other health-conscious individuals. Counterparts exist in South Korea and China.

Western energy drinks typically have caffeine and are targeted at a younger demographic, with colorful labels and printed claims of increased athletic/daily performance.

Pseudomedicinal drinks
See patent medicine

Composition

An elixir is a hydro-alcoholic solution of at least one active ingredient. The alcohol is mainly used to:
 Solubilize the active ingredient(s) and some excipients
 Retard the crystallization of sugar
 Preserve the finished product
 Provide a sharpness to the taste
 Aid in masking the unpleasant taste of the active ingredient(s)
 Enhance the flavor.
The lowest alcoholic quantity that will dissolve completely the active ingredient(s) and give a clear solution is generally chosen. High concentrations of alcohol give burning taste to the final product.

An elixir may also contain the following excipients:
 Sugar and/or sugar substitutes like the sugar polyols glycerol and sorbitol.
 Preservatives like parabens and benzoates and antioxidants like butylated hydroxytoluene (BHT) and sodium metabisulfite.
 Buffering agents
 Chelating agents like sodium ethylenediaminetetraacetic acid (EDTA)
 Flavoring agents and flavor enhancers
 Coloring agents

Storage
Elixirs should only be stored in a tightly closed, light resistant container away from direct heat and sunlight.

See also

 Brompton cocktail
 Concoction
 Elixir of life
 Internal alchemy
 Energy drink
 Soft drink
 Panacea (medicine), mythological remedy that would cure all diseases
 Suspension (chemistry)
 Syrup
 Spagyric
 Herbal tea
 Tincture, in which alcohol is the major solvent and the ingredient is often highly concentrated.
 Theriac

References

Drug delivery devices
Dosage forms